Aakhri Adaalat is a 1988 Indian Hindi-language action thriller film, directed by Rajiv Mehra. It stars Vinod Khanna, Dimple Kapadia, Jackie Shroff and Sonam.

Plot

Police Inspector Amar (Vinod Khanna) goes on a daring drug bust, ending in the arrest of notorious underworld criminals. Amar's work goes down the drain as the criminals dodge the law and are set free. Amar's seniors assign him a desk job and appoint Sub-Inspector Rima Kapoor (Dimple Kapadia) as Amar's assistant. Amar and Rima fall in love with each other and Amar introduces her to his mother and friend, Nitin (Jackie Shroff). Meanwhile, a vigilante wreaks havoc in the city, killing the members of the underworld. Rima stumbles upon Amar's closet, where she finds a helmet and a jacket worn by the vigilante and Amar is arrested and charged with multiple homicides. Is Amar the vigilante on a killing spree? How far will Amar go to decimate the underworld and restore justice?

Cast
 Vinod Khanna as Inspector Amar Kaushal
 Dimple Kapadia as Sub-Inspector Reema Kapoor
 Jackie Shroff as Nitin Sinha
 Sonam as Nisha Sharma
 Vinod Mehra as Barrister Shrikant Sharma
 Sushma Seth as Mrs. Kaushal 
 Seema Deo as Mrs. Sinha 
 A. K. Hangal as Retired Judge Kapoor
 Sudhir Dalvi as Police Commissioner 
 Shafi Inamdar as DSP
 Johnny Lever as Havaldar
 Gulshan Grover as Shiv Saran
 Paresh Rawal as Girja Shankar
 Sharat Saxena as Bansidhar
 Mahavir Shah as Girdhar 
 Bob Christo as Goon
 Gurbachan as Goon 
 Roopesh Kumar as Raghunandan
 Anjan Srivastav as Dr. Abdul Rehman
 Birbal as Chelaramani
 Krishan Dhawan as Goon
 Mangal Dhillon as Prosecuting Attorney
 Rajendra Mehra as Public Prosecutor for Shiv Saran
 Huma Khan as Rita
 Amrit Pal as Milkman who saw the mystery killer

Soundtrack

External links

1980s Hindi-language films
1988 films
Films scored by Anu Malik